Ekali (Greek: Εκάλη) may refer to the following places in Greece:
Ekali, a suburb of Athens
Ekali, Ioannina, a municipal unit in Ioannina regional unit
Ekali, Kavala, a village in Kavala regional unit
Ekali (DJ), Canadian electronic music DJ and producer